James McCaffrey may refer to:

 James McCaffrey (actor) (born 1959), American actor
 James D. McCaffrey, American software researcher and author
 Jim McCaffrey (footballer) (born 1951), English footballer
 Jim McCaffrey (basketball), American basketball player

See also
 James MacCaffrey (1875–1935), Irish priest
 James P. McCaffrey Trophy, a Canadian Football League trophy